James Allen Pattison  (born October 1, 1928) is a Canadian business magnate, investor, and philanthropist. He is based in Vancouver, British Columbia, where he holds the position of chief executive officer, chairman and sole owner of the Jim Pattison Group, Canada's second largest privately-held company, with more than 45,000 employees worldwide, and annual sales of $10.1 billion. The Group is active in 25 divisions, according to Forbes, including packaging, food, and forestry products.

In 2015, he was considered to be Canada's fourth richest person. According to Forbes, Pattison's net worth in late 2018 was $5.7 billion, having increased substantially from the $2.1 billion reported in March 2009. At the time, he was described as Canada's third richest man by Bloomberg News.

Pattison was inducted into Canada's Walk of Fame in December 2018, having previously been appointed to the Order of Canada (1987) and the Order of British Columbia (1990), and receiving the Governor General’s Commemorative Medal for the 125th Anniversary in Canada. Other recognition included being inducted into the Canadian Business Hall of Fame and the Canadian Professional Sales Association Hall of Fame, as well as Entrepreneur of the Year – Lifetime Achievement Award (2000), the International Horatio Alger Award (U.S.A., 2004), and the Young Presidents Organization Canadian Icon Award (2007).

Early life and education
Pattison's parents resided in the rural town of Luseland, Saskatchewan, when he was born at the hospital in nearby Saskatoon. The family moved to East Vancouver, British Columbia when Pattison was six years old, but he returned to Saskatchewan during summers.

His first summer job was playing trumpet at a children's church camp and later picking fruit (raspberries, cherries, and peaches) during the summer while in high school. Pattison had many jobs while in high school, including selling doughnuts in the school parking lot, selling seeds door-to-door, delivering newspapers, and working as a page boy at the Georgia Hotel. He graduated from John Oliver Secondary School in 1947.

After high school, he worked in a cannery, a packing house, as a labourer building bridges in the mountains, and then for the Canadian Pacific Railway as a dining car attendant before accepting a job washing cars at a gas station with a small attached used-car lot. By chance, while the regular salesman was away, Pattison sold one of the cars on the lot and found his profession. He parlayed that success into a job selling used cars during the summer at one of the largest used-car lots in Vancouver, using his earnings to pay for his studies at the University of British Columbia (although he did not complete his studies, being three classes short of a business degree).

Career
During a break from University in summer 1948, Pattison was selling cars at Richmond Motors in BC, although his primary duty was washing cars. In summer 1949, he worked for Kingsway, a used car dealer in Vancouver. "I worked there all summer and then [my boss] gave me a car to drive to university. So I then started to sell used cars at UBC," Pattison told a reporter.

By 1961, using his sales skills, he was able to persuade a Royal Bank manager to lend him $40,000, significantly more than the branch's lending limit, to open a Pontiac dealership on Main Street near his elementary school. To complete the funding, he also sold his house, assigned the cash surrender value of his life insurance policy to General Motors and took a loan from GM for $190,000 for preferred shares in the company. A quarter-century later, he was selling more cars than anyone else in Western Canada.

His company owned 25 car dealerships as of March 2018, Peterbilt truck dealerships, Overwaitea Foods, Save-On-Foods, Quality Foods, Ripley's Believe It or Not!, Guinness World Records, and radio and TV stations in British Columbia, Alberta, Saskatchewan, and Manitoba. Pattison entered the media business when he bought Vancouver AM radio station CJOR with five partners. The  Broadcast Group was Canada’s largest western-based radio and TV company in 2018, with 43 radio stations and three TV stations. Pattison Agriculture is the second-largest John Deere dealer in Canada, with 19 locations in Saskatchewan and Manitoba.

He also owned the Vancouver Blazers of the World Hockey Association.

Pattison led the organization of Expo 86 in Vancouver as the chief executive officer and president of the Expo 86 Corporation. When he was appointed to the Order of British Columbia, the award noted, "Although others may have had the initial vision for Expo ’86, it was Jimmy Pattison who was the expediter – the one more than anyone else who made it happen. He demanded much of his team but no more than he himself was prepared to give. This he did, almost full-time over a five-year period, without compensation..."

On February 15, 2008, Jim Pattison Group announced the purchase of the GWR organization, the company known for its Guinness World Records franchise. Its annual book, published in more than 100 countries in 37 languages, is the world's best-selling copyrighted book. Pattison, who owns approximately 30% of the shares of Canfor, was in a dispute over governance with money manager Stephen A. Jarislowsky, whose firm owned 18%. Pattison won and ousted CEO Jim Shepherd over Canfor's poor performance and declining share price, replacing him for the interim with Jim Shepard.

He was involved with the committee for the 2010 Vancouver Olympics. Among other honours, Pattison is an Officer of the Order of Canada and a member of the Order of British Columbia. He was also listed as No. 177 on the 2015 Forbes list of the world's richest people. He was also listed then as the richest Canadian.

In late 2018, Pattison was still working full-time, making a tour of Pattison Agriculture farm equipment dealerships across the west, for example, driving a pickup truck thousands of kilometers to do so. When asked by a Bloomberg reporter whether he ever took a vacation, Pattison replied, "Well, I get 365 days. If you like your work, it’s not work".

In September 2020, at age 91, Pattison was continuing to look for fresh investment deals. At that time, a news item stated that "Jim Pattison Group Inc. had $10.9 billion in revenue and employed 48,000 people".

Philanthropy
Imagine Canada rated the Jim Pattison Foundation in 2008 as the eighth largest giver of charitable grants by a private foundation in Canada.

On April 16, 2009, Jim Pattison announced that Save-On Foods donated $100,000 to CBC Television in order to rent high-definition television trucks for away games during the Vancouver Canucks' 2009 1st round NHL playoff series against the St. Louis Blues. Prior to this donation, CBC stated that it would not broadcast high-definition away games in St. Louis due to the cost of renting high-definition equipment during the current tough economic times and major cuts to funding for the CBC by the federal government.

Pattison is a well-known philanthropist, and an article in The Globe and Mail noted, "He has always given away 10% of his income." In July 2013, he donated up to $5 million to Victoria Hospitals Foundation (Victoria, British Columbia), to support its "Building Care Together" campaign to purchase new equipment for the new patient care tower at the Royal Jubilee Hospital. In recognition, the hospital named the ground floor lobby of the patient care tower "The Jim Pattison Atrium and Concourse." In 2011, Pattison contributed $5 million to add his name and to match public donations for a $10 million 100-day fundraising campaign in Surrey, British Columbia for the new Jim Pattison Outpatient Care and Surgery Centre run by Fraser Health. Other donations in the past included $20 million Vancouver General Hospital in 1999 and $5 million to the Lions Gate Hospital in 2008.

On March 28, 2017, Pattison donated $75 million to the construction of the new St. Paul's Hospital in Vancouver, a Canadian record for a private donation to a health care provider. On May 30, 2017, Pattison and the Jim Pattison Foundation announced they were donating $50 million, the largest private donation in Saskatchewan history, to the new Children's Hospital of Saskatchewan in Saskatoon, Saskatchewan which is expected to open in 2019. It was also announced that day the new hospital would be named Jim Pattison Children's Hospital in his honour.

During a March 2018 interview, Pattison made the following comment about his philanthropy. "We’ve got the base of our company – it’s taken us 57 years to build – where we can do some serious things and give serious money away as time goes by. The bigger we get the more money we make, and the more we can give away. We’re just getting into it."

Personal life
Pattison married Mary Hudson, whom he met at the Swift Current church camp when both were 13. Hudson was from Moose Jaw. Some 66 years later in 2018, Pattison commented, "The secret [to a successful marriage] is to marry somebody from Saskatchewan. Then you won’t have a problem!" The couple has three children.

At a Los Angeles auction on November 17, 2016, Pattison purchased (for $4.8 million) the Jean Louis dress worn by Marilyn Monroe when she sang "Happy Birthday, Mr. President" to President John F. Kennedy at a celebration of his 45th birthday. At age 90, Pattison still enjoyed playing the piano, organ and trumpet.

In 2011, Pattison was accused by a group of investors of secretly working to help Brookfield Management take over a 1.2 billion dollar granite mine owned by Birch Mountain for $50 million through “death spiral debt financing” and “insider trading”.

See also
Lists of billionaires

References

Further reading
 Jimmy: An Autobiography by Jim Pattison and Paul Grescoe (1987)
 Pattison: Portrait of a capitalist superstar by Russell Kelly (Nov 1986)

External links
The Jim Pattison Group main website
History of Jim Pattison Group - Canadian Communications Foundation

CBC Archives - Jim Pattison and Expo 86 (from 1985).
Video clip- Interview of Jim Pattison by BCBusiness Magazine

1928 births
Businesspeople from Vancouver
Businesspeople from Saskatchewan
Calgary Cowboys
Canadian billionaires
Canadian investors
Canadian retail chief executives
Canadian mass media owners
Canadian newspaper publishers (people)
Canadian Pentecostals
Canadian philanthropists
Canadian real estate businesspeople
Jim Pattison Group
Living people
Members of the Order of British Columbia
Officers of the Order of Canada
People from Saskatoon
Salespeople
UBC Sauder School of Business alumni